Barry D. Knight (born September 26, 1954, in Princess Anne County, Virginia) is an American politician. A Republican, he was elected a member of the Virginia House of Delegates in a special election on January 6, 2009. He  the 81st district, made up of parts of the cities of Virginia Beach and Chesapeake.

Early life
Knight was born and raised on a farm. After graduation from Kempsville High School, he worked as a truck driver to raise enough money to buy his own hog farm.  his business, Barry D. Knight Farms, produced about 12,000 hogs a year.

Knight was named the Virginia Farm Bureau's Young Farmer of the Year in 1983. He was president of the Tidewater Pork Producers 1984–1990. He was chairman of the Southern States Cooperative, and  vice president of the Virginia Beach Farm Bureau.

Knight married Paula Jane Whitehurst, c.1983. They have three sons, Hunter, Kyle and Forrest.

Political career
Knight served on the Virginia Pork Board, a gubernatorial appointment, 1995–c.2001. He was appointed to the Virginia Beach Planning Commission in 2003, and was elected chair in 2006.

In September 2008, Delegate Terrie Suit resigned her 81st district seat to take a job as a lobbyist. Knight ran for the Republican nomination, winning a three-way primary contest on November 29 over Virginia Beach Sheriff Paul Lanteigne and Tom Keeley, a retired United States Navy officer. Knight received 1,309 votes out of 2,218 ballots cast. He went on to beat Democratic activist John LaCombe handily in the special election on January 6, 2009.

See also
Virginia House of Delegates elections, 2009

Notes

References

 (Constituent/campaign website)

External links

1954 births
Living people
Republican Party members of the Virginia House of Delegates
Politicians from Virginia Beach, Virginia
21st-century American politicians